Vincent Angelo Meli (January 2, 1921 – January 7, 2008) was an Italian born-American mobster who was a soldier of the Detroit crime family.

Early years
Meli was born on January 2, 1921, in San Cataldo, Sicily, to Frank Meli and Grazia Panzica; and he immigrated to the United States at the age of 10. His father was a member of the Detroit Partnership along with his uncle Angelo Meli. His sister, Marie Antoinette, married attorney Bill Bufalino. His cousin, Maria, married Jack Tocco, future crime boss of the family.

In 1944, he graduated from the University of Notre Dame in South Bend, Indiana. Enlisting in the United States Army soon after graduation, Meli saw a lot of action and was discharged three years later. During his service, Vincent was a member of Operation Overlord. This was the code name for the Battle of Normandy where Allied operations launched the successful invasion of German-occupied western Europe during World War II. His division was a primary force in helping to secure Nuremberg concentration camps and free the prisoners.

Meli married Grace Mercurio, and had two daughters, Carmen and Phyllis, and four sons, Frank, Carl, Vincent, and Paul.

Music business and labor racketeering
Shortly after his return to Detroit, Meli became involved in organized crime. He was a major crime figure who attempted to gain control of Detroit's coin machine industry. At age 24, with the financial backing of his uncle Angelo, successfully bought the Meltone Music and Jay-Cee Music Co with Peter Tocco, Michael Polizzi, and Raffaele Quasarano.

A capo by the 1960s, Meli was a major labor racketeer and, through Anthony "Tony Jack" Giacalone, was an associate of Teamsters Union President Jimmy Hoffa. During the 1990s, Meli was tied to labor racketeering. He was named by former Detroit mobster Nove Tocco and retired federal agents as an associate of Michael Bane, president of Pontiac, Michigan's Teamster Local 614, during federal investigations into labor union corruption.

In 1979, Meli was convicted of extortion, and began serving a three-year sentence on January 3, 1984.

Death
Meli died on January 7, 2008, of bone cancer at St. John Macomb-Oakland Hospital Warren in Warren, Michigan, at the age of 87. He is buried in Resurrection Cemetery, Clinton Township, Macomb County, Michigan.

References

Further reading

External links

 

1921 births
2008 deaths
American gangsters of Sicilian descent
Burials in Michigan
Deaths from bone cancer
Detroit Partnership
Italian emigrants to the United States
People from Grosse Pointe Woods, Michigan
People from San Cataldo, Sicily
Gangsters from the Province of Caltanissetta
University of Notre Dame alumni
United States Army personnel of World War II